Nonconformity to the world, also called separation from the world, is a Christian doctrine based on ,  and other verses of the New Testament that became important among different Protestant groups, especially among Anabaptists. The corresponding German word used by Anabaptists is Absonderung. Nonconformity is primarily expressed through the practices of plain dress and simple living.

Biblical basis 
"Do not be conformed to this world but be transformed by the renewing of your minds, so that you may discern what is the will of God—what is good and acceptable and perfect." 
"Wherefore come out from among them, and be ye separate."  
"If any man love the world, the love of the Father is not in him." 
"Know ye not that the friendship of the world is enmity against God? Whosoever therefore would be a friend of the world is the enemy of God." 
"That which is highly esteemed among men is abomination in the sight of God." 
"Ye are a chosen generation, a royal priesthood, a holy nation, a peculiar people." 
"Pure religion and undefiled before God and the Father is this, To visit the fatherless and widows in their affliction, and to keep himself unspotted from the world."

History 
Even though not unique to Anabaptist Christians (such as Mennonites), the concept of nonconformity has found an unusually intense and detailed application among these groups. Other groups that practice forms of separation from the world  are the Exclusive Brethren and the Church of God (Restoration). 20th century minister and religious radio broadcaster Carl McIntire stressed the doctrine of nonconformity to the world.

Practice by Christian denomination

Anabaptism 
Among traditional Anabaptist groups nonconformity is practiced in relation to dress, the use of technology like horse and buggy transportation instead of cars, the rejection of television and radio, the use of language, that is German dialects like Pennsylvania German, Plautdietsch and others instead of English or Spanish, nonresistance, avoidance of oaths, avoidance of lawsuits, and other questions.

Anabaptist groups that practice nonconformity to the world today, belong either to the Old Order Movement, the "Russian" Mennonites the Hutterites or the Bruderhof. These groups live either in Canada and the US or in Latin America ("Russian" Mennonites).

Methodism 

Methodist theology traditionally emphasizes the scriptural injunction "be ye separate", which lessens temptation. The doctrine of separation from the world continues to be emphasized by Methodist connexions in the conservative holiness movement, such as the Evangelical Methodist Church Conference, which in its 2017 Book of Discipline, teaches:

Quakerism

References

Literature 

 John C. Wenger: Separated unto God: a Plea for Christian Simplicity of Life and for a Scriptural Nonconformity to the World. Scottdale, PA 1951.

External links 
 Separation and Nonconformity Colloquy Essays (FBEP) -PDF

Anabaptism
Mennonitism